,  for short, is a  high voltage direct current transmission line for the interconnection of the power grids of Hokkaidō (Hakodate static inverter station in Nanae) and Honshū (Kamikita static inverter station in Tohoku, Aomori Prefecture), Japan. The project went into service in 1979 by the Electric Power Development Company (J-POWER). A  overhead line and a  submarine cable connect the terminals. The HVDC Hokkaidō–Honshū is a monopolar HVDC line with an operating voltage of 250 kV and rated power of 300 megawatts. This HVDC system uses thyristor converters.

In 2019 a second HVDC system between the two islands, with a rated power of 300 MW and using Voltage-Source Converters, was put into operation.

Sites
  (Hokkaido) 
  (Hokkaido) 
  (Honshu) 
  (Honshu)

References

External links

 Hokkaido-Honshu HVDC Link, J-POWER
 Domestic facilities, J-POWER

 Photos of Hakodate AC/DC Converter Station , Laboratory of Electric Machinery, Kitami Institute of Technology
 https://web.archive.org/web/20050526185217/http://www.transmission.bpa.gov/cigresc14/Compendium/HOKKAIDO.htm
 https://web.archive.org/web/20050526185217/http://www.transmission.bpa.gov/cigresc14/Compendium/Hokkaido%20Pictures.pdf

Hokkaido-Honshu
HVDC transmission lines
Electric power infrastructure in Japan
Energy infrastructure completed in 1979
1979 establishments in Japan